The Wagner Noël Performing Arts Center (WNPAC) is a performing arts venue located between the cities of Midland, Texas and Odessa, Texas. WNPAC is owned by The University of Texas, and is built on a satellite campus of The University of Texas of the Permian Basin (UTPB). It houses an 1800-seat main concert hall and a 200-seat recital hall, and also houses the UTPB music department.

Awards
2013 USITT Architecture Merit Award

See also
 List of concert halls

References

External links
 

Concert halls in Texas
Theatres in Texas
Performing arts centers in Texas